Bleeding Hearts is a 1994 crime novel by Ian Rankin, under the pseudonym "Jack Harvey". It is the second novel he wrote under this name.

Plot summary

Michael Weston is a professional assassin, but he also suffers from haemophilia. The wealthy father of a girl he killed by mistake years ago has sworn vengeance on the killer, hiring a private detective (Hoffer) to track him down.

Rankin has said that he wrote this book under the influence of Martin Amis's novel Money and that Weston was influenced by that novel's protagonist John Self.

References

1994 British novels
British thriller novels
Novels by Ian Rankin
Works published under a pseudonym
Orion Books books